Robert Addison Bowlsby (born January 10, 1952) is an American college athletic administrator. Bowlsby most recently was the fourth commissioner of the Big 12 Conference a position he held from 2012 to 2022. Prior to that position, he served as the athletic director at the University of Northern Iowa, University of Iowa, and Stanford University.

Career
Born in Waterloo, Iowa, Bowlsby was the AD at the University of Northern Iowa, until taking over as the athletic director at the University of Iowa from 1990 to 2006 prior to becoming Stanford's sixth athletic director in 2006. In 2012, he was hired to be commissioner of the Big 12 Conference. Bowlsby was selected as the NCAA Basketball Selection Committee Head in 2006. He was also a part of the United States Olympic Committee for the 2008 Summer Olympics in Beijing, China.

On April 5, 2022, Bowlsby announced his intention to step down as Big 12 Commissioner later in 2022.

Personal life
Bowlsby graduated from Moorhead State University (now called Minnesota State University Moorhead) in 1975 and earned a master's degree from the University of Iowa in 1978. He is married with four children.

References

External links
 Big 12 Conference bio

1952 births
Living people
Big 12 Conference commissioners
Iowa Hawkeyes athletic directors
Stanford Cardinal athletic directors
Northern Iowa Panthers athletic directors
Minnesota State–Moorhead Dragons wrestlers
University of Iowa alumni
Sportspeople from Waterloo, Iowa